Veronica Bertolini (born October 19, 1995) is an Italian individual rhythmic gymnast. She is the five-time (2013-2017) Italian National all-around champion.

Biography 
Born in Sondrio, Italy, Bertolini started practicing rhythmic gymnastics in 2003 at 8 years of age.

Career
In 2009, Bertolini moved to Desio, Italy at the sports club  ASD San Giorgio '79. In 2010, Bertolini became a member of the Italian National team and competed at the 2010 European Junior Championships in Bremen, she qualified in the Ball finals finishing in 6th place.

Bertolini debuted as a senior in the 2011 Season and has competed in the World Cup series and Grand Prix series. In 2013, Bertolini participated at the 2013 European Championships in Vienna, Austria. She finished 28th in the all-around qualifications at the 2013 World Championships in Kyiv and did not advance to the Top 24 finalists.

In 2014, Bertolini was invited for a monthlong technical training in Russia's famous Novogorsk Sport center for rhythmic gymnastics. She had her highest placement finishing 22nd in the all-around finals at the 2014 World Championships in Izmir.

In 2015, Bertolini started her season at the Moscow Grand Prix finishing in 15th in all-around. She competed at the Lisboa World Cup finishing 19th in all-around and 26th position at the Pesaro World Cup. At the 2015 Summer Universiade in Gwangju, South Korea, she finished 10th in the all-around. She competed at the 2015 World Cup Final in Kazan, finishing 28th in the all-around. At the 2015 World Championships in Stuttgart, Bertolini qualified for her second all-around finals finishing in 23rd position and with Team Italy placing 14th in the overall standings. She finished 8th in the all-around at the 2015 Aeon Cup behind Austria's Nicol Ruprecht.

In 2016, Bertolini competed at the 2016 Espoo World Cup finishing 12th in the all-around with a total of 68.850 points. On March 17–20, she then competed at the 2016 Lisboa World Cup where she finished 9th in the all-around ahead of Kazakh Sabina Ashirbayeva. On April 1–3, she competed at the 2016 Pesaro World Cup where she finished 8th in the all-around (a PB: 70.900) and qualified to clubs final. On April 21–22, Bertolini won an Olympics license by finishing third amongst a top 8 selection of highest score for non qualified gymnasts at the 2016 Gymnastics Olympic Test Event held in Rio de Janeiro. On May 27–29, Bertolini then finished 11th in the all-around at the 2016 Sofia World Cup with a total of 69.000 points. On June 17–19, Bertolini then competed at the 2016 European Championships where she finished in 12th place. On July 8–10, Bertolini then finished 9th in the all-around at the 2016 Kazan World Cup with a total of 71.500. On July 22–24, culminating the World Cup of the season in 2016 Baku World Cup, Bertolini finished 5th in the all-around with a total of 72.600 points - a New Personal Best, she qualified to all apparatus finals placing 4th in hoop, 5th in ball, 4th in clubs and 8th in ribbon.

On August 19–20, Bertolini competed at the 2016 Summer Olympics held in Rio de Janeiro, Brazil. She finished 19th in the rhythmic gymnastics individual all-around qualifications and did not advance into the top 10 finals.

In 2017 Season, On April 7–9, Bertolini competed at the 2017 Pesaro World Cup finishing 11th in the all-around. She retained as the Italian National All-around champion. Bertolini competed at the quadrennial held 2017 World Games in Wrocław, Poland from July 20–30, however she did not advance to any of the apparatus finals. On August 11–13, Bertolini competed at the 2017 Kazan World Challenge Cup finishing 16th in the all-around.

Routine music information

References

External links
 Veronica Bertolini at International Federation of Gymnastics
 Rhythmic Gymnastics Results
 

1995 births
Living people
Italian rhythmic gymnasts
People from Sondrio
Gymnasts at the 2016 Summer Olympics
Olympic gymnasts of Italy
Sportspeople from the Province of Sondrio
21st-century Italian women